Jonathan A. Levine (born June 18, 1976) is an American film director and screenwriter.

Early life and education
Levine was born and raised in New York City to a Jewish family. He attended St. Bernard's School, in Manhattan, and Phillips Academy, in Andover, Massachusetts. He received his bachelor's degree from Brown University, where he majored in Art Semiotics. He earned his Masters of Fine Arts (MFA) in Film Directing from the American Film Institute, in Los Angeles, at its AFI Conservatory.

Career
Levine was the assistant to film director Paul Schrader prior to his own directorial career taking-off. In 2006, he was nominated for a Best Independent Mini-Feature Award at the Black Reel Awards for his AFI Thesis short film Shards (2004), which also won a Certificate of Excellence at the 2005 Brooklyn Film Festival for Best Cinematography by Petra Korner. He wrote and directed a documentary short entitled Love Bytes (2005), where he sets out on a cross country roadtrip to find love in major cities with the assistance of a laptop and an Audi A3.

His feature directorial debut was the 2006 dramatic horror film All the Boys Love Mandy Lane, starring Amber Heard with the screenplay written by Jacob Forman. The film had its premiere at the 2006 Toronto International Film Festival, followed by screenings at the Sitges Film Festival, South by Southwest, London FrightFest Film Festival, and the IFI Horrorthon, at the French Cinemathèque. In 2008, he wrote and directed The Wackness, starring Josh Peck. It won the Audience Award at the 2008 Sundance Film Festival and was nominated for the Grand Jury Prize (Dramatic) as well. The Wackness also won Best Narrative Feature at the 2008 Los Angeles Film Festival, The Most Popular Feature Film Award at the 2008 Melbourne International Film Festival, and was nominated for a Best First Screenplay award at the 2008 Independent Spirit Awards. In addition, the film won Best International Feature Film at the 2008 Zurich Film Festival.

Next, Levine directed the 2011 film 50/50 starring Seth Rogen, Joseph Gordon-Levitt and Anna Kendrick, about a young man being treated for cancer. It was loosely based on the experience of screenwriter Will Reiser, a friend of Rogen's. 50/50 won the Audience Award at the 2011 Aspen Filmfest, the Audience Award at the 2011 Stockholm Film Festival and the Achille Valdata Award at the 2011 Torino International Film Festival /Torino International Festival of Young Cinema. In 2013, Levine directed Warm Bodies, based on the novel by Isaac Marion. It stars Nicholas Hoult as a zombie who slowly beings to return to normal, and forces a girl played by Teresa Palmer to stay with him.

In 2014, Levine directed the pilot episode of the TV series he created with Gina Matthews and Grant Scharbo, Rush, for the USA Network. A medical drama series revolving around a hard-partying doctor named William P. Rush played by Tom Ellis, it was cancelled after one season. The next year he re-teamed with his 50/50 stars Rogen and Gordon-Levitt for Christmas comedy The Night Before, which he directed and co-wrote. It also starred Anthony Mackie, Lizzy Caplan, Mindy Kaling, Jillian Bell and Miley Cyrus in a cameo role.

Levine filmed a pilot for a Showtime comedy series created by executive producer Jim Carrey titled I'm Dying Up Here, based in part on the 2010 non-fiction book of the same name by William Knoedelseder about the stand-up comedy scene in LA during the 1970s. It has been announced that Levine will direct Brooklyn Castle, a feature adaptation of the 2012 documentary of the same name. The storyline tells about a group of New York's inner city, junior high school kids who wanted  to compete in a highly prestigious, highly selective national chess tournament

Writing
In addition to writing or co-writing the screenplays for many of the feature or short films that he directed, Levine has written an episode of the TV series The Screen Junkies Show entitled "Zombie Acting Tips" (2013). He wrote the screenplay for the short film The Weight (2009), directed by Nicholas Jarecki. He wrote two episodes of Rush, the pilot (which he also directed) and "Don't Ask Me Why".

Producing
Levine produced the 2016 film Mike and Dave Need Wedding Dates, directed by Jake Szymanski and starring Zac Efron, Adam Devine, Anna Kendrick, and Aubrey Plaza. He served as an executive producer on Rush.

Filmography

Short film

Feature film

Producer
 Mike and Dave Need Wedding Dates (2016)

Television

References

External links
 
 

1976 births
Living people
American male screenwriters
Comedy film directors
Film directors from New York City
Brown University alumni
Jewish American screenwriters
AFI Conservatory alumni
Writers from New York City
St. Bernard's School alumni
Phillips Academy alumni
Screenwriters from New York (state)
21st-century American Jews